Walter Plinge is a pseudonym, used in British theatres since the 19th century on occasions when it is not possible or desirable to make an actor's real name known.

Name and usage
Walter Plinge is a pseudonym traditionally used in British theatres when a part has not been cast, an actor is playing two parts, or an actor does not want their name in the programme. The name has also been used in radio and television credits. Who's Who in the Theatre has this entry for the name:

In 1939 Alfred Wareing, a former member of Benson's company, wrote in The Stage that the real Walter Plinge had been the landlord of the public house in Wellington Street near the stage door of the Lyceum Theatre, London. Wareing recalled that Plinge was not entirely pleased at having his name used by Benson, particularly as the company already had other pseudonyms in use when needed. These included "R. Sherard" and "T. Ashman" – the latter used by among others Oscar Asche when doubling roles, although in Asche's case, according to Wareing, the false name "never deceived the knowing public". Another former Bensonian recalled the pseudonym "Hugh S. Hay" being used when the American actor Walter Hampden was in the company. The actor-manager Murray Carrington recalled that in the 1920s his company had featured not only Walter Plinge Jr. but also a female counterpart, Juliet Plinge.

The name Walter Plinge has been used occasionally in American theatre, where the more usual equivalent is "George Spelvin". Analogous pseudonyms – for writers rather than actors – are Alan Smithee in Hollywood and David Agnew at the BBC. From its earliest years the BBC has used "Walter Plinge" in its listings of acting roles, and "he" is the corporation's longest-serving broadcaster, having made his first broadcast in 1925, with subsequent appearances up to 2018.

Notes, references and sources

Notes

References

Sources
 

Anonymity pseudonyms
Collective pseudonyms
English stage actors